Droxidopa (INN; trade name Northera; also known as L-DOPS, L-threo-dihydroxyphenylserine, L-threo-DOPS and SM-5688) is a synthetic amino acid precursor which acts as a prodrug to the neurotransmitter norepinephrine (noradrenaline). Unlike norepinephrine, droxidopa is capable of crossing the protective blood–brain barrier (BBB).

Medical uses
 Neurogenic orthostatic hypotension (NOH) dopamine beta hydrolase deficiency, as well as NOH associated with multiple system atrophy (MSA), familial amyloid polyneuropathy (FAP), pure autonomic failure (PAF).
 Intradialytic hypotension (IDH) or hemodialysis-induced hypotension.
 Freezing of gait in Parkinson's disease (off-label)

Side effects
With over 20 years on the market, droxidopa has proven to have few side effects of which most are mild. The most common side effects reported in clinical trials include headache, dizziness, nausea, hypertension and fatigue.

Pharmacology
Droxidopa is a prodrug of norepinephrine used to increase the concentrations of these neurotransmitters in the body and brain. It is metabolized by aromatic L-amino acid decarboxylase (AAAD), also known as DOPA decarboxylase (DDC). Patients with NOH have depleted levels of norepinephrine which leads to decreased blood pressure or hypotension upon orthostatic challenge. Droxidopa works by increasing the levels of norepinephrine in the peripheral nervous system (PNS), thus enabling the body to maintain blood flow upon and while standing.

Droxidopa can also cross the blood–brain barrier (BBB) where it is converted to norepinephrine from within the brain. Increased levels of norepinephrine in the central nervous system (CNS) may be beneficial to patients in a wide range of indications. Droxidopa can be coupled with a peripheral aromatic L-amino acid decarboxylase inhibitor (AAADI) or DOPA decarboxylase inhibitor (DDC) such as carbidopa (Lodosyn) to increase central norepinephrine concentrations while minimizing increases of peripheral levels.

Chemistry
Droxidopa, also known as L-threo-dihydroxyphenylserine (L-DOPS), is chemically analogous to levodopa (L-3,4-dihydroxyphenylalanine; L-DOPA). Whereas levodopa functions as a precursor and prodrug to dopamine, droxidopa is a precursor and prodrug of norepinephrine.

History
Droxidopa was developed by Sumitomo Pharmaceuticals for the treatment of hypotension, including NOH, and NOH associated with various disorders such as MSA, FAP, and PD, as well as IDH. The drug has been used in Japan and some surrounding Asian areas for these indications since 1989. Following a merger with Dainippon Pharmaceuticals in 2006, Dainippon Sumitomo Pharma licensed droxidopa to Chelsea Therapeutics to develop and market it worldwide except in Japan, Korea, China, and Taiwan. In February 2014, the Food and Drug Administration approved droxidopa for the treatment of symptomatic neurogenic orthostatic hypotension.

Clinical trials
A systematic review and meta-analysis conducted on clinical trials comparing the clinical use of droxidopa and midodrine have found that midodrine was more likely to cause supine hypertension than droxidopa in patients with NOH. Midodrine was also found to be slightly more effective at raising blood pressure but not statistically significantly so.

Chelsea Therapeutics obtained orphan drug status (ODS) for droxidopa in the US for NOH, and that of which associated with PD, PAF, and MSA. In 2014, Chelsea Therapeutics was acquired by Lundbeck along with the rights to droxidopa which was launched in the US in Sept 2014.

Research
Droxidopa alone and in combination with carbidopa has been studied in the treatment of attention deficit hyperactivity disorder (ADHD).

References

External links
 

Amino acids
Catecholamines
Phenylethanolamines
Prodrugs